Alexander Berntsson (born 30 March 1996) is a Swedish footballer who plays for Halmstads BK as a defender.

References

External links

1996 births
Living people
Association football defenders
Halmstads BK players
Swedish footballers
Allsvenskan players
Superettan players
Sweden youth international footballers